Licmetis is a subgenus of the white cockatoos (genus Cacatua). They are collectively known as corellas in Australia. Three of the six species are primarily – or only – found in Australia, while the Philippines, Indonesia, and the Solomons each have an endemic species. They are relatively small cockatoos and – unlike the members of the subgenus Cacatua – all have pale bills. While most show yellow-tinged underwings and some red to the face, none has conspicuously coloured crests.

Species
Long-billed corella, Cacatua (Licmetis) tenuirostris
Western corella, Cacatua (Licmetis) pastinator
Muir's corella, Cacatua (Licmetis) pastinator pastinator
Butler's corella, Cacatua (Licmetis) pastinator butleri
Little corella, Cacatua (Licmetis) sanguinea
Red-vented cockatoo, Cacatua (Licmetis) haematuropygia
Tanimbar corella, Cacatua (Licmetis) goffiniana
Solomons cockatoo, Cacatua (Licmetis) ducorpsii

References

 Brown, D. M., and Toft, C. A. (1999). Molecular systematics and biogeography of the cockatoos (Psittaciformes: Cacatuidae). Auk 116(1): 141–157.
 Juniper, T., and Parr, M. (1998). A Guide to the Parrots of the World. Pica Press, East Sussex. 

.3
Cacatua